The European stick insect (Bacillus rossius) also called the European stick bug or the European walking stick and the Mediterranean stick insect is a species of stick insect, common in Europe. The species is endemic to the northwestern Mediterranean, especially Spain, Southern France, Italy and the Balkans.

Overview
Adults have a slim body, with short antennae and long, thin legs. Colors vary from brown to green, sometimes with a pinkish tinge on its head, legs and sides. This species can eat bramble leaves, ivy, and privet. B. rossius can be found from June to mid December and the eggs look like seeds. Females are larger than the male, with a bigger abdomen. An adult can be 10 cm (4 inches) in length.

Life cycle 
The nymphs hatch out from their seed-like eggs 8 weeks to 2 months after being laid by a female. like the adult, the nymphs sway as in a breeze to avoid predators. B. rossius lives up to a year. They are nocturnal and may stay still for hours and usually feed at night. They shed the exoskeleton a few times in their life.

Predators 
The predators include birds, frogs, lizards, rodents and spiders.

Gallery

See also 

Bacillus atticus atticus, the endemic Bacillus of Greece

References

External links 

 Phasmid Study Group: Bacillus rossius
 Bacillus rossius at phasmatodea.com 
 ASPER site : Information about this species. (in French)

Phasmatodea
Phasmatodea of Europe
Articles containing video clips
Insects described in 1788
Taxa named by Pietro Rossi